Frederick Zadok Rooker was the first American Bishop of the Roman Catholic Diocese of Jaro in the Philippines, from 12 June 1903 until his death on 18 September 1907. He was born in New York City, on 19 September 1861, son of a journalist and night editor of the New York Tribune Myron Holley Rooker, who married Margaret Coleman. As a boy, he attended public school in Albany, New York. Later, he studied civil engineering and Latin at the Union College in Schenectady, New York.

Formation, Ordination, and Early Years in the Priesthood

At the end of his junior year studies, Frederick went to Rome to pursue formation for ordination to the priesthood at the Collegium Urbanum, which is under the immediate direction of the Propaganda Fidei (now called Congregation for the Evangelization of Peoples). From this institution he finished his doctoral degrees in Philosophy and in Theology, and was ordained a priest, on 25 July 1888. From 1889 to 1894, he served as Vice Rector of the North American College.

Rev. Frederick Rooker returned to the United States of America in 1895 to work as secretary of the Apostolic Delegation in Washington D.C. At the same time, he was selected to be the lecturer in Ethics at the newly established Social Sciences Faculty of the Catholic University of America. He held these posts until his appointment as Bishop of Jaro.

In 1901, Rev. Rooker was made a Personal Chamberlain of the Pope, advancing his title to Monsignor.

Promotion and Episcopal Consecration

Monsignor Frederick Rooker was appointed Bishop of Jaro, on 12 June 1903. He was consecrated by Sebastiano Cardinal Martinelli, O.E.S.A, Cardinal-Priest of the Basilica of Sant'Agostino, Rome and who was his former Superior at the Apostolic Delegation in Washington D.C., on 14 June 1903. His Principal Co-Consecrators were Archbishop Nicola Giuseppe (Nicolae Iosif) Camilli, O.F.M. Conv. (Titular Archbishop of Constantia in Scythia) and Bishop Raffaele Virili (Titular Bishop of Troas).

Acts as Bishop of Jaro

Among the first acts of Mons. Rooker as Bishop of Jaro was to  reorganize St. Vincent Ferrer Seminary after the Filipino-American War. With his help, the seminary went back to normal life at the beginning of the School Year 1904-1905, this time under the American flag. At the start of the School Year 1906-1907, the enrollment was more than six hundred students.

The Bishop also invited the Sisters of St. Paul of Chartres to serve in his Diocese, which included at that time half of the States of Visayas and of Mindanao. This Congregation developed a chain of Universities in the Philippines, which became known for training nurses. On 29 October 1904, seven sisters from Vietnam arrived to establish the first Saint Paul's school in the Philippines in Dumaguete.

The Bishop from New York also fought hard to regain the properties of the Catholic Church in his Diocese and, at one time, going to the extent of forcing the Municipal President of the town of Dumangas to hand over the keys of the old Spanish Church sequestered by the local government for use of the Aglipayans. The news that Bishop Rooker would celebrate Mass in the church the next Sunday  generated some rumors of the Aglipayan threat to drive a herd of carabaos into the church during the service. Hearing this, the Americans volunteered to accompany the Bishop, who dared to celebrate the Mass with a revolver beside him on his episcopal throne. No carabao turned out and, since then, the old Spanish Church was reopened for Catholic worship service.

Views on the Aglipayan Church

Bishop Rooker viewed the Philippine Independent Church as the "Katipunan which had outlived its political usefulness and which, with a strong arm, the government suppressed as a political society, at once put on the soutane of the priest and become the Independent Philippine Church." The  move was, according to Bishop Rooker, a cunning one. "As an independent church it made no profession of working against the established authority for political freedom; and under the guarantee of liberty of worship was beyond the power of government interference... and the very arguments they use to induce people to join it and to become its "priests" are arguments of political scope and nature. It is, in all its own proclamation, the Church of the Filipino, in which white men are to have no part, to join which and work with and for is a demonstration of Filipino patriotism, to fail to join it [is] a proof of sympathy with American domination. Being founded by and made up of the Federalist, it held in its hands all the power and influence of local civil authority, and it held the ear of the American authority in Manila."

Views on the Spanish Missionaries and on the Friar Question

Bishop Rooker exposed the falsity of the Friar question, saying that the object of this propaganda was "aimed at the Catholic Church, and that it was marked for attack because it meant an influence for the maintaining of legitimate authority even though that authority might reside in the hands of the white race." He told the US President Theodore Roosevelt that some "self-constituted leaders of an uprising against authority and of a disturbance of public order... represented and spoke for Filipino desires and aspirations and sentiments [claiming that] they were good Catholics, and spoke for the Catholic people of the Philippines, and that the desire of the country was that the Friars should go, and that there was and there would be no other religious question." However, the Bishop of Jaro dismissed this claim of the self-proclaimed Filipino Catholic leaders as lies. He said that "there was in reality no Friar question at all - as such. It was untrue that the great mass of the people wanted the departure of the Friars. The great mass of the people looked on the Friars simply as priests and respected them as such. They were perfectly willing that they should remain and minister to them spiritually and they made no distinction between them and the other priests save in rare cases; and the cases in which this distinction was favorable to the Friars were as many more than those in which it was contrariwise. Moreover, there never was a particle of reason to urge or force the departure of the Friars. They were voluntarily leaving in droves. Where there were some twenty-six hundred of them in the islands before the troubles, there are now and have been for three years not more than four hundred all told, and nearly all of these are in Manila."

Last Years as Bishop of Jaro

Another important act that Bishop Rooker accomplished as Bishop of Jaro was the immediate rebuilding of St. Vincent Ferrer Seminary after it was reduced into heaps of ashes by a fire from a candle, which was carelessly left burning in the sacristy, on  7 October 1906. The Bishop began the work of reconstruction two months after the fire. Through the financial support of the priests and the faithful of the Diocese, as well as of Bishop Rooker's many friends in America, and through a substantial financial aid from Pope Pius X, three fifths of the building was completed in less than a year. The space was already sufficient to house one hundred interns that, by 17 September 1907, a solemn inauguration of the new building was done.

The day after, on 18 September 1907, the joy of the Diocese was turned into mourning when Bishop Rooker was stricken by heart attack and died hours later. He was just at the initial stage of his pastoral work and his mission was far from complete. It was the day before his 46th birthday.

The mortal remains of Bishop Frederick Zadok Rooker were not brought back to his home Country, but were buried in Jaro Cathedral in the land of the people for whom he was consecrated to serve.

References

1861 births
1907 deaths
20th-century Roman Catholic bishops in the Philippines
Pontifical Urban University alumni
Pontifical North American College alumni
Roman Catholic bishops of Jaro
19th-century American Roman Catholic priests
20th-century American Roman Catholic priests